The Golf Manor Synagogue also known as Congregation Agudas Israel is an orthodox Jewish synagogue located in Golf Manor, Ohio.

History

The synagogue was founded by immigrants from Romania and Poland. The synagogue was founded at an undetermined date as the B'nai Israel Congregation. In 1932, the congregations of Anshei Shalom and Bnai Jacob congregations merged to form Agudas Israel Congregation. In the same year, it moved to a former church in Avondale. In 1952, Rabbi David Indich became the synagogue's spiritual leader. In 1957, it was noted that Golf Manor Synagogue had dedicated the first pre-fabricated synagogue.

In 1967, a new sanctuary for the synagogue of 350 families was built in Golf Manor on Stover Avenue and dedicated a year later. In 1989, Rabbi Balk became the Rabbi of the synagogue, while Rabbi Indich became Rabbi Emeritus. By 1994, the congregation had shrunk to a "listed 250 membership units". Toward the end of 2012, Rabbi Balk became Rabbi Emeritus. Rabbi Pinchas Landis became the new rabbi on January 1, 2013; with Rabbi Stuart Lavenda becoming the senior rabbi in October 2014. Lavenda maintained that role until his retirement March 2019, being succeeded by Rabbi Yosef Alt who took leadership of Golf Manor Synagogue as head rabbi in January 2019.

References

External links
Golf Manor Synagogue Website
Children tell Hanukkah story in radio program

Polish-American culture in Ohio
Polish-Jewish culture in the United States
Romanian-American culture in Ohio
Romanian-Jewish culture in the United States
Synagogues in Cincinnati
Orthodox synagogues in Ohio